Wali Khan Mosque is an 18th-century mosque located in Chittagong, Bangladesh. It is situated in the Chawk Bazar area of the city.

History
The mosque was built between 1713 and 1716 by Wali Beg Khan, who was a Mughal Faujdar or General in Chittagong. Wali Khan, the founder of Chawk Bazar, also donated land for maintenance of the mosque.

See also
 List of mosques in Bangladesh

References

Mosques in Chittagong
Religious buildings and structures completed in 1716
1716 establishments in Asia